The Hancock County Courthouse in Hawesville, Kentucky is an 1859-built courthouse which was listed on the National Register of Historic Places in 1975.

It is a two-and-a-half-story building, designed by a Robert Boyd of Boston, Massachusetts.  It has an octagonal cupola.

References

Courthouses on the National Register of Historic Places in Kentucky
Greek Revival architecture in Kentucky
Italianate architecture in Kentucky
Government buildings completed in 1859
National Register of Historic Places in Hancock County, Kentucky
1859 establishments in Kentucky
County courthouses in Kentucky